Needle drop may refer to:

 Needle drop (DJing), a technique used by DJs

 Needle drop (audio), a version of a music album that has been transferred from a vinyl record to digital audio
 "Needledrop" (Space Ghost Coast to Coast), a television episode
 The Needle Drop, a blog/vlog created and run by music critic Anthony Fantano
 Needledrop, a 2020 album by Session Victim

 Needle drop (movie scoring), the use of an existing recording rather than an original score in a film.
 Stock music